The 2014–15 Iran Super League season was the 25th season of the Iranian basketball league. The league used the two-conference format this time, starting with the National League. The Professional League was the second conference in the season. Teams were not allowed to hire foreign players or imports in the first conference National League.

Conference 1

Regular season

Standings

Results

Playoffs
 The results of the games during the regular season shall be taken into account for the playoffs.

Semifinals
The higher-seeded team played the third and fifth leg (if necessary) at home.

|}

Third place
The higher-seeded team played the third and fifth leg (if necessary) at home.

|}

Final
The higher-seeded team played the third and fifth leg (if necessary) at home.

|}

Conference 2

Regular season

Standings

Results

Playoffs
 The results of the games during the regular season shall be taken into account for the playoffs.

Semifinals
The higher-seeded team played the third, fourth and seventh leg (if necessary) at home.

|}

Third place
The higher-seeded team played the third and fifth leg (if necessary) at home.

|}

Final
The higher-seeded team played the third, fourth and seventh leg (if necessary) at home.

|}

References

 Asia Basket
 Iranian Basketball Federation

Iranian Basketball Super League seasons
Iran